Aki Rahunen (born 24 December 1971) is a former professional tennis player from Finland.

Career
Rahunen was the 1989 winner of the Under-18s European Junior Tennis Championships, held in Prague.

He performed well in the 1990 ATP Tour, reaching quarter finals at Stuttgart, Umag and Båstad. In Stuttgart he defeated top 50 players Javier Sánchez and Amos Mansdorf, both in straight sets. He was also a semi finalist at the Florence Open that year and reached the third round of the 1990 French Open.

In the Davis Cup he appeared in 10 singles matches for the Finnish team, with a 6–4 record. He helped Finland qualify for the World Group in 1990.

Challenger titles

Singles: (1)

See also
List of Finland Davis Cup team representatives

References

External links 
 
 

1971 births
Living people
Finnish male tennis players
Sportspeople from Helsinki
20th-century Finnish people